Angelo Altieri (died 1472) was a Roman Catholic prelate who served as Bishop of Nepi e Sutri (1453–1472).

Career
On 30 April 1453, Angelo Altieri was appointed during the papacy of Pope Nicholas V as Bishop of Nepi e Sutri.
He served as Bishop of Nepi e Sutri until his death in 1472.

While bishop, he was the principal co-consecrator of Mamerto Fichet, Auxiliary Bishop of Genève and Titular Bishop of Hebron (1470).

References

External links and additional sources
 (for Chronology of Bishops) 
 (for Chronology of Bishops) 

15th-century Italian Roman Catholic bishops
Bishops appointed by Pope Nicholas V
1472 deaths